Alcione was the name of at least three ships of the Italian Navy and may refer to:
 , a  launched in 1906 and discarded in 1923.
 , a  launched in 1937 and sunk in 1941.
 , an  launched in 1954 and stricken in 1991.

Italian Navy ship names